The Spin is an album by the American jazz band Yellowjackets, released in 1989. The album title refers to the Earth's rotation. The band supported the album with a North American tour.

The album was nominated for a Grammy Award, in the "Best Jazz Instrumental Performance, Group" category. It peaked in the top 10 on Billboards Jazz Albums chart.

Production
Yellowjackets had originally hoped to record The Spin with Claus Ogerman. Instead, the album was recorded in Oslo, Norway, in February 1989; it demonstrated a more acoustic sound than the band's previous efforts, relying less on synthesizers. Completed in three weeks, it was engineered by Jan Erik Kongshaug. The band sought to make the album as melodic as possible while still working within a traditional jazz setting. 

Alex Acuña played percussion on the album.The Spin was the final album with saxophonist Marc Russo as a band member.

Critical reception

The Chicago Tribune wrote that The Spin "includes a few especially engaging cuts—'Storytellers' and a bebopish 'Whistle While You Walk', to name two—and some credible soloing by saxophonist Marc Russo." The Star Tribune noted the "more personal and more improvisational sound." 

The Vancouver Sun concluded that "there is an intellectual coolness to some of this talented quartet's jazz instrumentals that is almost cold." The Austin American-Statesman determined that The Spin "won't be mistaken for classic acoustic jazz, but it is solidly rooted in a mainstream jazz sound, stressing its melodic elements over its rhythmic ones." The Houston Chronicle considered the album to be the band's best.

Track listing
 "Geraldine" (Russell Ferrante) - 6:00
 "The Spin" (Ferrante, Jimmy Haslip, Marc Russo, Will Kennedy) - 4:22
 "Storytellers" (Ferrante) - 6:10
 "Prayer for El Salvador" (Ferrante) - 5:29
 "Whistle While You Walk" (Ferrante) - 4:47
 '"Enigma" (Ferrante, Haslip) - 4:23
 "Dark Horses" (Barry Coates, Ferrante, Haslip) - 4:33
 "Blues for Nikki" (Russo) - 3:56
 "A Flower Is a Lovesome Thing/Hallucinations" (Billy Strayhorn/Bud Powell) - 8:01

Track 9 is available on the CD release only.

 Personnel Yellowjackets Russell Ferrante – keyboards
 Jimmy Haslip – bass
 Will Kennedy – drums, percussion
 Marc Russo – saxophonesGuest Musicians Alex Acuña – percussion arrangements

 Production 
 Yellowjackets – producers
 Jan Erik Kongshaug – engineer
 Stephen Marcussen – mastering
 Dick Bouchard – design 
 Jeff Lancaster – design 
 Robin Ghelerter – illustrations
 Jim Bengston – photography 
 Gary Borman – management Studios'
 Recorded at Rainbow Studios (Oslo, Norway)
 Mastered at Precision Lacquer (Los Angeles, CA, USA)

References

Yellowjackets albums
1989 albums
MCA Records albums